Georg "Allan" Frank (14 December 1907 – 13 November 1944) was a German international footballer.

Frank scored four goals as Germany thrashed Switzerland 7–1 in a friendly on 10 February 1929.

Personal life
Frank served as a Stabsgefreiter (corporal) in the German Army during the Second World War. He was killed in action in Poland on 13 November 1944.

References

External links
 
 
 

1907 births
1944 deaths
Association football forwards
German footballers
Germany international footballers
German Army soldiers of World War II
German Army personnel killed in World War II
Sportspeople from Fürth
Footballers from Bavaria
Military personnel from Fürth